The governor of Sindh is the appointed head of the province of Sindh, Pakistan. The office of the governor as the head of the province is largely a ceremonial position; the executive powers lie with the chief minister and the chief secretary of Sindh.

However, there were instances throughout the history of Pakistan, the powers of the provincial governors were vastly increased, when the provincial assemblies were dissolved and the administrative role came under direct control of the governors, as in the cases of martial laws of 1958–1972 and 1977–1985, and governor rules of 1999–2002. In the case of Sindh, there were three direct instances of governor's rule under Mian Aminuddin, Rahimuddin Khan and Moinuddin Haider respectively, in 1951–1953, 1988, and 1998 when the provincial chief ministers of those times were removed and assemblies dissolved.

The governor is appointed by the president on the advice of the prime minister. The Governor House in Karachi is the official residence of the governor of Sindh. Kamran Tessori is the current governor of Sindh.

Arab Sind 

The Muslim province of Sind was under the reign of Umayyad and Abbasid caliphates. The governor of Sind was an official of Umayyad and Abbasid caliphates.

Governor of Sindh 
Sir Charles Napier (1843-1847) became the first ever Chief Commissioner and Governor of Sind.

List of governors of Sindh

Following is the list of Sindh governors after the independence of Pakistan in 1947.

See also 
 Chief Minister of Sindh
 Government of Sindh
 Provincial Assembly of Sindh
 List of governors of Pakistan
 List of chief ministers in Pakistan
 List of presidents of Pakistan
List of commissioners and governors of Sind in British India
Commissioner Karachi
Mayor of Karachi
Administrator Karachi
Government of Karachi

References

 List of Governors of Sindh

External links 
 Official website: Governor of Sindh
 News: Saeeduzzaman Siddiqui Appointed As New Governor Sindh
 Sindh Governor Ishratul Ibad removed from office

Governors of Pakistani provinces
Governors of Sindh